Ethylketazocine (WIN-35,197-2), is an opioid drug of the benzomorphan family which has been used extensively in scientific research in the last few decades as a tool to aid in the study of the κ-opioid receptor. However, due to its relatively poor selectivity for the κ-opioid receptor over the μ- and δ-opioid receptors (of which it has approximately 80% and 20% of the affinity for, respectively, in comparison), as well as its relatively poor intrinsic activity at all sites (i.e., acts as a partial agonist with mixed agonist and antagonist properties), it has been mostly replaced in recent times by newer and more potent and selective compounds like U-50,488 and ICI-199,441.

See also 
 Benzomorphan
 Ketazocine

References 

Analgesics
Benzomorphans
Opioids
Sigma agonists